Mauretania was an ancient Berber kingdom.

Mauretania may also refer to:

Places
 Mauritania or Mauretania, a modern country in Africa
 Colonial Mauritania, the colonial period in modern Mauritania
 Ancient Roman provinces of:
 Mauretania Tingitana
 Mauretania Caesariensis
 Mauretania Sitifensis

Ships
 RMS Mauretania (1906), an ocean liner in service until 1934
 RMS Mauretania (1938), an ocean liner scrapped in 1965

Others
 Mauretania, a British Rail Class 40 diesel locomotive
 Mauretania Public House in Bristol
 Mauretania Comics

See also
 Mauritius, an island in the Indian Ocean